Iyanya Onoyom Mbuk (born 31 October 1986), known by his stage name Iyanya, is a Nigerian Afropop recording artist.

Career
He rose to fame after winning the first season of Project Fame West Africa and is best known for his hit single "Kukere". He co-founded the record label Made Men Music Group with Ubi Franklin in 2011. He released his debut studio album My Story in 2009. It was supported by the singles "No Time" and "Love Truly". Desire, his second studio album, contained five singles: "Kukere", "Ur Waist", "Flavour", "Sexy Mama", and "Jombolo". He won the Artist of the Year award at The Headies 2013. In October 2016, Iyanya announced on Instagram that he signed a record deal with Mavin Records. Few months prior, he signed a management deal with Temple Management Company. He first announced his intentions to leave Made Men Music Group in July 2016.

Early life and education
Iyanya was born on Palm Street in Calabar, Cross River State. His mother was a head mistress and his father was a forester. Iyanya has described his mother as the household disciplinarian, while his father was the gentler of the two. His parents both died in 2008, and his older brother died around the same time. Iyanya's grandfather was a clergyman where Iyanya sang in his church's choir and was the choir master for the children's choir at age five.

Mbuk completed his primary, secondary, and university education in Calabar. He is a business management graduate from the University of Calabar.

Career
After graduating from the University of Calabar, he worked in a hotel and sang karaoke at a local bar he managed. Iyanya began developing his vocal abilities at local bars which include: Fiesta Fries Bar, Mirage Nite Club, and West-Life.  Iyanya cited British singer Craig David and American hip hop artist R. Kelly as his key musical influences. Iyanya was motivated to pursue music professionally after watching the celebrity lifestyle of 2 Face Idibia and Olu Maintain. Iyanya started as a rapper, going by the name "Lofty".

MTN Project Fame
In 2008, KCee from KC Presh convinced Iyanya to partake in the first season of Project Fame West Africa. Iyanya went on and emerged the winner of the competition after battling numerous people who had the same aspirations as him. The 2008 MTN-sponsored Project Fame competition was the beginning of Iyanya's musical career. Unlike many people who dwindle after a major competition, Iyanya's success had just begun.

2009: My Story

After winning MTN's Project Fame West Africa, Iyanya began recording his debut album My Story. It was released by CN Media Imprint. The album showed Iyanya's versatility as an R&B artist, particularly on the self-titled track "Iyanya" and "Love Truly". Iyanya's debut album was a commercial failure due to problems with distribution and promotion.

2012–2013: Desire

After visiting his hometown of Calabar and seeing people's affection for the Etighi dance, Iyanya decided to do a song that would popularize the dance that originated in Calabar. He teamed up with producer DTunes and recorded "Kukere", a single that achieved global success, particularly in Nigeria, Ghana and the United Kingdom. The song was succeeded by the album's second single entitled "Ur Waist", which features additional vocals from Emma Nyra.

Endorsements
On 16 October 2013, 360Nobs reported that Iyanya became an ambassador for Solo Phones Nigeria, a mobile phone company situated at Computer Village, Ikeja. The one-year deal was reportedly worth $220,000 (35 million naira). In addition, Iyanya got a 2014 Toyota Prado from the deal. In 2013, the Daily Independent newspaper reported that Iyanya also signed a one-year deal with Zinox Computers (Nigeria's first certified branded computers) worth $300,000. The deal will feature Iyanya on Zinox billboards and in TV commercials.

Musical style

Iyanya started performing ballads, particularly on his debut album My Story. In an interview with Toolz on Ndani TV, he said he wants to be a versatile artist and wants to be known for his R&B and Afrobeats abilities. In the same interview, he also said he switched from R&B to Afrobeat because he wanted to make money and wanted fans to see his versatility.

International appearances
On 25 November 2012, Iyanya performed at comedian AY Makun show held at the INDIGO2 arena. To promote his second album in the UK, Iyanya headlined the Iyanya vs. Desire concert. It started in London and ended in Manchester. The London concert was held at the INDIGO2 arena on 9 June 2013. It featured performances from Tonto Dikeh and Emma Nyra. On 14 June 2013, the Manchester concert commenced and featured performances from Emma Nyra and DRB Lasgidi. Iyanya and his label mate Emma Nyra went on a mini tour across the US and Canada in early 2013. Iyanya performed at the Shrine in Chicago on 11 April 2013. He also performed at the African Muzik Magazine launch on 12 April 2013, which was held in Dallas, Texas. Iyanya serenaded Grammy Award nominee Melanie Fiona at the LTB Jean store in Soho, New York, and performed at the world-renowned New York Fashion Week.

Films and television

Awards and nominations

Discography

The discography of Iyanya consists of two studio albums, twenty two singles (including ten as featured artist), five promotional singles, and fourteen music videos.

Studio albums

Compilation albums

Singles
As lead artist

As featured artist

Promotional singles

Music videos
As lead artist

As featured artist

References

External links

 

1986 births
Living people
Nigerian rhythm and blues singers
Nigerian male pop singers
Nigerian male singer-songwriters
21st-century Nigerian male singers
Musicians from Calabar
Musicians from Cross River State
The Headies winners
Participants in Nigerian reality television series
University of Calabar alumni
People of Efik descent